Arild Stubhaug (born 25 May 1948) is a Norwegian mathematician, poet and biographer.

Stubhaug was born in Naustdal, and is married to Kari Bøge. He made his literary debut in 1970 with the poetry collection Utkantane. He has written biographies of the mathematicians Sophus Lie, Niels Henrik Abel and Gösta Mittag-Leffler.

He received the Brage Prize in 1996 for the biography Et foranskutt lyn. Niels Henrik Abel og hans tid, translated into English under the title Niels Henrik Abel and his Times:Called Too Soon by Flames Afar,

He followed up with the 250-year history of the Royal Norwegian Society of Sciences and Letters (2010) and biographies of Jacob Aall (2014) and Stein Rokkan (2019).

Awards 
 Brage Prize, 1996
 Norsk språkpris, 2001
 Norwegian Academy Prize in memory of Thorleif Dahl, 2008
 Doblougprisen 2010

References

1948 births
Living people
20th-century Norwegian poets
Norwegian male poets
People from Naustdal
20th-century Norwegian male writers
Norwegian biographers
20th-century Norwegian historians
Male biographers
21st-century Norwegian historians
Norwegian mathematicians